Lynwood Unified School District is a school district headquartered in Lynwood, California, United States.

Schools

Adult schools
 Lynwood Community Adult School - The LVAS Testing Center is located at 11277 Atlantic Avenue and the day and evening classes are held at a new location in the back of the Lynwood High School Campus located at 4050 E. Imperial Hwy.

High schools
 Marco Antonio Firebaugh High School
 Lynwood High School
 Vista High School
 Pathway High School

Middle schools
 Lynwood Middle School
 Cesar E. Chavez Middle school
 Hosler Middle School

Elementary schools
 Helen Keller Elementary School
 Janie P. Abbott Elementary School
 Lincoln Elementary School
 Lindbergh Elementary School
 Lugo Elementary School
 Mark Twain Elementary School
 Roosevelt Elementary School
 Rosa Parks Elementary School
 Thurgood Marshall Elementary School
 Washington Elementary School
 Will Rogers Elementary School
 Woodrow Wilson Elementary School

References

External links
 

School districts in Los Angeles County, California
Lynwood, California